The World Women's Billiards Championship is an English billiards tournament, first held in 1931 when organised by the cue sports company Burroughes and Watts then run from 1932 by the Women's Billiards Association (WBA). It is currently run under the auspices of World Billiards Ltd (WBL), a subsidiary company of the World Professional Billiards and Snooker Association.

It should not be confused with the Women's Professional Billiards Championship, which was also run by the WBA, or with the International Billiards and Snooker Federation World Women's Billiards Championship held in 2015.

The reigning champion is Jamie Hunter. Emma Bonney has won the title a record 13 times.

History
A Women's Amateur Billiards Championship was organised by cue sports company Burroughes and Watts. 23 players entered, and the highest break made was 28. Ruth Harrison was the champion.

The Women's Billiards Association took over responsibility for the tournament in 1932, when there were 41 entries. Thelma Carpenter made the highest break, 45, on her way to winning the title. Capenter won in 1933 and 1934 to complete a hat-trick of victories, before turning professional and going on to compete in the Women's Professional Billiards Championship. Vera Seals, a receptionist from Chesterfield that had learnt the game from Joe Davis, took the 1935 title, and set a new highest break record of 62. The tournament was held regularly until 1940, but then put on hold until after World War II. From 1947 to 1980 the tournament was held most years, with Vera Selby winning eight titles, and Maureen Baynton (Née Barrett) winning seven. Mrs Morland-Smith was another player to win multiple titles. In 1960, at the age of 75, she attempted to defend her title, but was unsuccessful.

After a period of dormancy from 1980, the tournament was revived in 1998, when Karen Corr won the first of two titles. The dominant player since the 1998 revival has been Emma Bonney, who has won the title 13 times.

World Billiards Ltd (WBL), a subsidiary company of the World Professional Billiards and Snooker Association, currently runs the competition. In June 2019, the International Billiards and Snooker Federation and World Billiards Ltd agreed that the World Billiards Championship would be held by the WBL in 2019 in Australia and by the IBSF in 2020 and to co-operate to avoid tournament dates clashing. The tournament was not held in 2020 or 2021.

Finals
Main sources: Billiards and Snooker Control Council Handbook and Rules (1978); Guinness Snooker – The Records (1985); World Billiards Ltd: World Ladies Billiards ChampionsAdditional sources are cited within the table where used. In some cases the information in those differs from the main sources mentioned.

Wins by player

Notes

References

External links 
World Billiards Ltd.
In pictures: World Ladies Billiards Championship 2010 (BBC)

Recurring sporting events established in 1931
Billiards
Competitions in English billiards
World championships in English billiards